Hapag-Lloyd AG is a German international shipping and container transportation company. Hapag-Lloyd was formed in 1970 through a merger of Hamburg-American Line (HAPAG) and Norddeutscher Lloyd.

History

The company was formed on September 1, 1970, by the merger of two German transportation/maritime companies, Hamburg-American Line (HAPAG), which dated from 1847, and Norddeutscher Lloyd (known in English as North German Lloyd), which was formed in 1857.

Since its formation, Hapag-Lloyd has seen changes among its shareholders and has also undergone a number of mergers with other companies. For instance, Hapag-Lloyd was completely acquired by, and became a subsidiary of TUI AG (Hanover) in 1998. This transition was followed by TUI selling a majority stake of Hapag-Lloyd to private investors in Hamburg in 2009 and further sales in 2012. Other important events in the company's history include Hapag-Lloyd's acquisition of CP Ships in 2005 as well as Hapag-Lloyd's merger with the container business of CSAV in 2014, and United Arab Shipping Company in 2017.

HAPAG

The Hamburg-Amerikanische Packetfahrt-Aktien-Gesellschaft for shipping across the Atlantic Ocean was founded in Hamburg. In 1912, Hapag built the first of their "Big Three" ocean liners; the Imperator, followed by its twins Vaterland. The third twin, Bismarck, was under construction at the outbreak of World War I and was completed after the war for White Star Line as the Majestic. These were the first liners to exceed 50,000 gross tons and 900 feet in length. During World War I, the majority of Hapag's fleet of 175 ships were wiped out, and most of the surviving ships (including the "Big Three") had to be turned over to the winning side as war reparations. After war's end, Hapag rebuilt its fleet with much smaller ships than before the war, but their fleet was again mostly wiped out during World War II, and surviving ships turned over to allied powers.

Norddeutscher Lloyd

Norddeutscher Lloyd (NDL) was formed in 1857 in the City-State of Bremen, offering passenger and cargo transportation between Bremen and New York, with an emphasis on emigration to the United States. Service started in June 1858 with the Bremen, the first of four steamships, and the company established its American base at Hoboken, New Jersey. NDL eventually built a large fleet of ships that carried many thousands of emigrants westwards, with around 218,000 passengers transported across the Atlantic in 1913 alone.

The outbreak of World War I resulted in the internment of 32 vessels in US ports, a status later changed to confiscation when the US entered the war in 1917. Likewise, its Hoboken base was confiscated, and turned over to the US Navy, which used it as a transshipping point for the duration. As with HAPAG, those NDL ships surviving the war were eventually confiscated as reparation, leaving the company to start over from scratch.

US-Operations were resumed in 1922, when NDL was able to purchase its former base from the United States Alien Property Administrator. NDL launched a new Bremen and Europa in 1929–30.

During World War II, NDL repeated its World War I experience, with some parts of its fleet again being interned at the outbreak of the war, while a number of vessels remained under NDL control. One such exception was the Bremen, which raced across the Atlantic, and achieved protection at Murmansk in 1939, before eventually making a dash for Bremerhaven, where she was ultimately destroyed by a fire in 1941.

Passenger service resumed in 1954 with the Gripsholm formerly belonging to the Swedish American Line (the ship was renamed to  only the following year).

NDL attained several speed records over the years. Notable among them was the record for the run between Southampton and New York of eight days in 1881, which was set by the Elbe; and the record for the fastest transatlantic crossing set by the new Bremen in 1929 (see Blue Riband).

Hapag-Lloyd

Hapag and NDL continued to compete until establishing a joint-venture container line. The "Hapag-Lloyd Container Line", founded in 1967 and operating from 1968 onward, was established to share the huge investments related to the containerisation of the fleets. The two companies finally merged on September 1, 1970 under the name Hapag-Lloyd.

Hapag-Lloyd was acquired in 1998 by Preussag AG (since 2002 named TUI AG (Hanover)), a tourism conglomerate, and became its fully owned subsidiary in 2002.

In August 2008, TUI announced an intention to sell its entire stake in Hapag-Lloyd shipping activities before the end of that year. Industry speculation predicted a sale price of approximately $US5.9 billion.

In October 2019, Hapag-Lloyd acquired a 10 percent stake in Container Terminal 3 (TC3) of the Tangier Med 2 port in Morocco.

In April 2022, Hapag-Lloyd acquired a participation in JadeWeserPort Wilhelmshaven, taking ownership of a 30 percent stake in Container Terminal Wilhellmshaven (CTW) and a 50 percent stake in Rail Terminal Wilhelmshaven (RTW).

Mergers and acquisitions

CP Ships Limited

On 21 August 2005, TUI AG agreed to acquire the Canadian business CP Ships Limited for €1.7 billion (US$2.0 billion) in cash. The deal, which was approved by the boards of both CP Ships, TUI, and the shareholders, was a success, and made the combined fleet the fifth-largest by capacity in the worldwide container shipping market.

Hamburg Süd

In late 2012, Hapag-Lloyd announced it was considering the possibility of a merger with its smaller compatriot Hamburg Süd. The merger plans were scotched when Hamburg Süd's shareholders and owners did not reach an agreement with the Hapag-Lloyd stakeholders. After this event, Hamburg Süd remained a private, independent company until December 2016, when the container transport division of Danish logistics and energy company Maersk, announced it would purchase Hamburg Süd.

Compañía Sud Americana de Vapores (CSAV)

In 2014, Hapag-Lloyd took over the container business of Chile's Compañía Sud Americana de Vapores SA (CSAV), with the latter becoming a major shareholder of Hapag-Lloyd. This made Hapag-Lloyd the fourth-largest container-shipping company in the world at the time.

United Arab Shipping Company (UASC)
In April 2016, Hapag-Lloyd announced it was in merger talks with the United Arab Shipping Company (UASC). The merger was agreed upon later in 2016 and the integration between the two companies was completed in 2017. At the time of the merger, UASC was reported to be the world's 10th largest liner shipping company with a fleet of 56 ships and a market share of 2.7 percent. As a result of the merger, Hapag-Lloyd strengthened its position as the world's fifth largest container transporter in terms of vessel capacity, ahead of Taiwan's Evergreen Line. As a result of the merger, the former shareholders of UASC would become the largest shareholder in the new entity, whilst Hapag-Lloyd would absorb all operations and assets of UASC.

Historically United Arab Shipping Company was jointly established in July 1976 by the six shareholding governments of the Arab states of the Gulf (Bahrain, Iraq, Kuwait, Qatar, Saudi Arabia and UAE). Originally based in Kuwait, its corporate headquarters then moved to Dubai during the Iraqi conflict, and only some departments were moved back after the war.

The UASC fleet operated more than 45 services, connecting the Middle East to Europe, the Mediterranean, Indian Sub-continent, Far East, West Africa and the Americas. Its network covered over 220 ports, offering containerized and conventional cargo shipping by a fleet of 58 owned and chartered vessels. On June 29, 2016, UASC's six shareholding states voted unanimously to approve the proposed merger. The deal gave a relative valuation of the two businesses at 72 percent for Hapag-Lloyd and 28 percent for UASC. At the time of the merger, UASC was 51 percent owned by Qatar and 35 percent owned by Saudi Arabia government, with the remainder held by other Arab states.

NileDutch Transport & Shipping 
In March 2021, Hapag-Lloyd announced the acquisition of Nile Dutch Investments B.V., a leading container service provider to and from West Africa. The transaction was effectively closed on July 8, 2021.

Deutsche Afrika-Linien 
On June 1, 2022, Hapag-Lloyd closed the acquisition of the container liner business of German carrier Deutsche Afrika-Linien (DAL), another Africa specialist, operating with liner services between Europe, South Africa and the Indian Ocean.

Services and business areas

Container transportation
Hapag-Lloyd transports containerized cargo on several major trade routes around the world. It has a prominent market presence and brand recognition in Latin America, Middle East, trans-Atlantic, and trans-Pacific trades, among others.
Hapag-Lloyd is currently the largest member of the Transport High Efficiency vessel-slot sharing alliance ("THE Alliance"), which was created in April 2017 and also includes Taiwan's Yang Ming Line, Korea's HMM and the Japanese carrier Ocean Network Express (ONE). THE Alliance covers East-Westbound trades with 255 container ships and 29 services.

Hapag-Lloyd Kreuzfahrten 
Hapag-Lloyd Kreuzfahrten was a former cruise ship subsidiary of Hapag-Lloyd AG. In  2008, TUI AG integrated Hapag-Lloyd Kreuzfahrten. It was renamed Hapag-Lloyd Cruises in 2016. In 2020, Hapag-Lloyd Kreuzfahrten was sold to TUI Cruises, a joint venture between TUI and Royal Caribbean. Only vessels formerly operated by Hapag-Lloyd AG are listed here.

Former Fleet

Airline activities
Hapag-Lloyd founded the charter airline Hapag-Lloyd Flug in 1972, buying a few Boeing 727s to fly its cruise passengers from Germany to the cruises' ports of call. The airline eventually added some regular passenger flights as well. Hapag-Lloyd Flug used the IATA code HF and became a directly owned subsidiary of Preussag AG in 1999.

Fleet
Some emblematic group's vessels are:

 MS München (1972)
Tokio Express (1973)
Yantian Express (2012), formerly Shanghai Express (2002)
Houston Express (2005)
Savannah Express (2005)
Colombo Express (2005)
Kyoto Express (2005)
Chicago Express (2006)
Osaka Express (2007)
Tsingtao Express (2007)
Hong Kong Express (2013)

Accidents and incidents

Colombo Express 
On 29 September 2014, the container ship Colombo Express was involved in a collision with the container ship Maersk Tanjong, and sustained a 20-metre (65 ft) dent to its left side and caused delays to traffic through the Suez Canal.

See also

 List of largest container shipping companies
 724 Hapag

References

External links

 Hapag-Lloyd
 Hapag-Lloyd Cruises
 TUI AG (Hanover)
 Hamburg American Line History and Ephemera GG Archives
List of NDL ships with pictures
North German Lloyd History and Ephemera GG Archives

Companies based in Hamburg
Transport in Hamburg
Shipping companies of Germany
Cruise lines
Container shipping companies
Transport companies established in 1970
German brands
1970 establishments in West Germany
German companies established in 1970